is a music video game developed by Konami for the Family Computer Disk System, and published in 1987.

The software's retail package included a musical keyboard-like input device for playing and composing music with various synthesized instruments. The 36-key keyboard comprises three-octaves.

The game's title alludes to the first three solfège syllables, do, re, and mi.

See also
List of Family Computer Disk System games
List of Konami games

References

1987 video games
Famicom Disk System games
Famicom Disk System-only games
Japan-exclusive video games
Konami games
Music video games
Video games developed in Japan